Ishqbaaaz(international title :Game of love ) is an Indian romantic drama television series that aired from 27 June 2016 to 15 March 2019 on Star Plus. It initially starred Nakuul Mehta, Surbhi Chandna, Kunal Jaisingh, Shrenu Parikh, Leenesh Mattoo and Mansi Srivastava. In December 2018, the show took a generation leap and aired a new season, Ishqbaaz: Pyaar Ki Ek Dhinchak Kahaani starring Nakuul Mehta and Niti Taylor.

Plot
Kalyani Singh Oberoi, the matriarch of the family has two sons, Tej and Shakti. Tej is married to Jhanvi and they have three children, Omkara, Rudra and Priyanka. Shakti is married to Pinky and has a son, Shivaay, who is the eldest grandson.

This story is about the Oberoi brothers', Shivaay, Omkara and Rudra, friendship and romances.

Shivaay crosses paths with the self righteous Annika, who confronts him for trying to suppress the poor with the misuse money and lineage. To which, Shivaay slaps her with a bunch of cash. Presuming that he won the conversation, he moves to his car, only to face Annika breaking the glass of his windshield, and slapping him with the same bunch of cash, earning the nickname "Khidki-tod".

Surprised by the video showing all these incidents, Dadi, Omkara, and Rudra find Annika at the party they had organized for their grandfather's birthday. But Shivaay ignores her there because he has no knowledge about her bloodline or lineage.

Shivaay firmly believes that he doesn't have time for love and hence plans to marry Tia Kapoor as a business deal. Dadi hires Anika as a wedding planner for Shivaay and Tia's upcoming wedding. At first, his relationship with Annika becomes more hostile due to misunderstandings.

After the misunderstandings are cleared, Shivaay starts to understand Annika and they both start to develop feelings for each other. Unaware of the emotions, Shivaay still plans to marry Tia.

Daksh, Shivaay's childhood friend turns up at his door and falls for Annika at first sight, which soon turns into an obsession. Angered after being rejected twice, Daksh lies to Shivaay that Annika agreed to sleep with him for one night in exchange for money, leading Shivaay to hate her.

On Shivaay and Tia's wedding day it is revealed that she is already married to Robin. Due to turn of events Tia runs away from her wedding which leads to Shivaay forcibly marrying Annika.

Meanwhile, Omkara crosses paths with Ishana, who introduces herself as Bela to him. Ishana wanted to marry Omkara to gain all the wealth he has, and invents lies to gain his sympathy. Ishana tries to trick both of them but fails as the three Oberoi brothers try to expose her. Some time later, Ridhima lies and betrays Omkara and collaborates with his father to make Omkara the sole heir of the Oberoi empire. Disheartened, he breaks up with her.

In the meantime, Rudra has a chance encounter with the cute and sweet Soumya, who consoles him as Shivaay's life is in danger. Rudra starts to like Romi, a hot fresher and tries his best to win her. By chance, Soumya also comes to college and is happy to see a familiar face, only to be ignored by Rudra as she was a little fat and that would have reduced his reputation. Due to the turn of events, and under the influence of alcohol, Rudra and Soumya marry, which they decide to conceal and forget.

After a rocky start, Annika and Shivaay clear the misunderstandings between them and eventually fall in love. Together, they expose Tia's marriage and her mother, Mrs. Kapoor's, evil intentions. Later, Shivaay accepts Annika as his wife in front of everyone.

Due to Priyanka's pregnancy, Shivaay fixes her wedding with a police officer, Ranveer Randhawa, who hated Priyanka as she was the reason his sister died. Kamini Khurana Randhawa, Ranveer's adoptive mother, enters. She has a past with Shivaay's father as Shakti is constantly teased by his brother about Kamini. Kamini and Ranveer have an evil plan. Meanwhile, Shivaay's doppelganger kidnaps him and takes his place in the Oberoi mansion. Suspicious, Annika finds out that he is not the real Shivaay, she rushes to find and save the real one.

Together, they expose the fake Shivaay, Mahi. Simultaneously they expose Ranveer and his foster mother, Kamini who is Shivaay's father's former girlfriend. It's revealed that Mahi is Kamini's illegitimate son with Shakti as she wants to use her son for Oberoi wealth. Afterwards, it's revealed that Priyanka isn't pregnant.

As Shivaay and Annika become closer, Pinky opposes their relationship, and blackmails Annika to leave the marriage. She reveals that Mahi is not Shivaay's doppelganger but his twin brother and that Shivaay is the illegitimate son of Shakti and Kamini. Pinky tells Anika that she has three days to leave or else she will reveal the truth to Shivaay and he will feel devastated. Shattered, Annika pours her heart out to Omkara and Rudra on the promise that they will never reveal any of the conversation to Shivaay. Annika pretends that she wants the wealth of the Oberois and that she doesn't want Shivaay to indulge with his brothers. She also claims Omkara illegitimate, which infuriates Shivaay, leading him to divorce her. After Annika leaves, he suffers a heart attack but is saved. Meanwhile, Omkara marries Gauri Kumari Sharma, but hates her and the concept of love (their story is shown more in the spinoff series Dil Boley Oberoi).

Rudra at a party falls in love with Bhavya, an undercover ACP on a mission. She later uses him for her mission, Rudra and Bhavya fake a marriage just so she can hide out in the Oberoi mansion.

Three months later
Omkara is comatose. Shivaay has become emotionless over the time and his behaviour has changed. Ragini Malhotra, a lady with fame and name becomes obsessed over Shivaay and wants to marry him. She fakes a story of her abusive fiancé Siddharth. She succeeds in gaining Shivaay's sympathy. Pinky wants Ragini as her daughter-in-law. Meanwhile, Annika, who has been depressed, has been living with her best friend Chanda, she repeatedly fails to find employment. Omkara recovers from coma and later Omkara ask Annika's help after discovering how emotionless Shivaay has become.

Annika returns and claims the Oberoi Mansion as her own after having it signed by Omkara. She promises Omkar that she will help Shivaay recover. She tries to make Shivaay jealous but her plan backfires as he claims to fix his engagement with Ragini, though not meaning it. Ragini fabricates many lies to gain sympathy from Shivaay in Pinky's advice.

Soon, Shivaay senses that maybe he didn't want to leave Annika at all but she wanted to push him away knowingly. He tries to figure out the reason, while Annika claims that Vikram Aditya Thapar, a big industrialist is her fiancé. Shockingly, Vikram takes part in the charade without being asked to. Meanwhile, Shivaay exposes Ragini's lies. Later, even after being asked to step back, Vikram doesn't, and manipulates situations between Shivika. Shivaay and the others rescue Annika from him and he brings her home, which angers Pinky.

She tries to blackmail Annika again but, Shivaay plans to spread the truth. It is revealed that Pinky had lied about the illegitimate son situation, and was also the master of all conspiracies, including the fake Shivaay. Shattered, Shivaay refuses to accept Pinky as his mother.

Later, he proposes marriage to Annika in front of the media, which she accepts, and they plan their marriage. Meanwhile, Gauri inspires Omkara's inner artist, Rudra and Bhavya form a special bond. In an exhibition, Gauri embarrasses Omkara due to her weak English and decides to learn the language so that Omkara takes pride in calling her his wife. She plans it as a surprise with only confiding it to Annika and Shivaay. Due to which, she would stay out of the house for hours without informing Omkara which leads him to suspect her.

Meanwhile, as Bhavya and Rudra fall in love with each other she reveals that she is four years older than Rudra which makes him rethink about everything between him and her. Later, he decides to let go of the age difference and follows Bhavya on her mission. But misunderstandings follow there and Bhavya decides to marry her best friend, Manav. Dejected and disheartened, Rudra insults Bhavya in front of everyone, for which Bhavya slaps him and, later refuses to marry.

Anika and Shivaay's wedding happens happily and peacefully. But after the marriage bad omens follow and Shivaay goes missing, but then returns, claiming to have no memory of Annika and introduces his wife Tanya. It is revealed that the Oberois have another brother, Abhay Singh Oberoi. Annika slowly figures out that Shivaay is just pretending to have no memory of Annika. It is also revealed that Abhay is behind the charade.

Meanwhile, Omkara's doubts about Gauri are confirmed when he sees Gauri and another man's name written in a hotel register. Also, after being framed for taking bribes, ACP Bhavya Pratap Rathore is suspended.

Omkara confronts Gauri and berates her for betraying him. In tears, Gauri clears all misunderstandings after giving him evidence of her innocence. She explains about the surprise, and confesses her true love for him in English. But heartbroken, Gauri promises to never interfere in his life ever again, and leaves for Bareilly.

Guilt stricken Omkara realizes his love for Gauri and decides to win her back. Meanwhile, Rudra still heartbroken, joins the fashion sector of the Oberoi company and appoints a suspended Bhavya as his bodyguard. He tricks her into signing a contract according to which she can't leave the job before working for three months. He humiliates and berates her, thinking she is married to Manav.

Omkara turns up at Gauri's doorstep on Karwachauth dressed up as a sardar who Gauri fails to recognize. He introduces himself as Dilpreet Singh and starts living in their house on rent. He tries to win her heart as Dilpreet Singh.

Meanwhile, Shivaay tries solving the mystery of the fire that broke out in Kalyani mills. Later together, Annika, Shivaay, Rudra, and Bhavya disguised reach Bareilly, to help Omkara win Gauri back. Gauri becomes entangled in an unnecessary marriage because of her friend. She sends Omkara and the others back but when she becomes aware of the ill intention of her fiancé she tries to escape, and to her luck, the Oberoi brothers kidnap her and bring her back to the Oberoi mansion.

Rudra feels lonely as both his brothers have their own romances to indulge into, so he plans a Goa trip with the two of them. Meanwhile, Pinky's cousin Dinky arrives who keeps pestering Annika and Gauri to not have blind faith in their husbands.

On the way, the Oberoi brothers have a chance encounter with Piya, a dance choreographer who drugs them, dances with them and makes a video of it. The next morning, the brothers wake up oblivious of what happened the previous night. They rush back home, only to find that Piya is also at the Oberoi mansion as Dinky's family friend's daughter. It is revealed that Dinky planned this charade.

Piya initially threatens to show this video in public but gradually understands that they are truthful and trustworthy. She steps back but Dinky displays this video in Dadi's birthday party only to realize later that the brothers have earned the trust from their wives truthfully.

The next morning, Annika requests Shivaay for tamarind according to a diet plan she was planning to follow. Dinky overhears the tamarind and suspects pregnancy. After not having anything for hours, Annika faints near the dining table during lunch. This confirms Dinky and she announces Annika's pregnancy. Only to realize later that Annika and Shivaay haven't consummated their relationship yet. After which they plan to consummate and succeed.

Abhay returns with the claims of being another Oberoi brother. He also brings Svetlana into the Oberoi mansion claiming to be her husband. Meanwhile, Rudra still assumes Bhavya is married to Manav, berates her for one last time and fires her from the job only to realize that she was never married to Manav. Later Svetlana blackmails Shivaay into transferring Rudra and Omkara's property to her.

This leads to misunderstandings between Tej and Shivaay, resulting in Shivaay and Annika leaving the Oberoi mansion and going for their "Vanvas". They leave for Goa, while the Oberoi family and mansion are split in two. In Goa, they meet Veer Pratap Chauhan, their new neighbor, who turns out to be planted by Svetlana to seek revenge on Annika. He tries to prove Annika mad so that Shivaay would leave her and he would save Annika.

Failed, he then tries to kill Shivaay. Meanwhile, Shivaay and Soumya bring Bhavya and Rudra face-to-face in his house in Goa one last time before Bhavya leaves for abroad, where Rudra confesses his true feelings to her and proposes marriage to her.

While Rudra plans to marry in Goa with Shivaay, Tej performs Gauri's last rites as she fails to obey his orders. Disheartened, Gauri and Omkara also arrive at Shivaay's house in Goa. Happily, the three Oberoi brothers and their wives with grandmother's blessings perform Rudra and Bhavya's pre-wedding rituals. Soumya reveals to Veer that she is the younger sister of Svetlana and Tia and now she wants to marry Rudra. She joins forces with Veer.

Veer tricks Tej into signing the house deeds to be auctioned, from which Shivaay saves them. At same time he exposes Svetlana and again lives in the Oberoi mansion as everybody blames Tej of the troubles and he leaves.

On Valentine's Day, Annika figures out that Veer is not what he seems to be and tries to warn Shivaay but, that night Shivaay shoots Annika dead. Panicked and guilt stricken, he unknowingly takes help from Veer.

The next day Shivaay keeps a press conference where somebody plays the leaked video of Shivaay shooting Annika. As Shivaay is about to be arrested a police inspector brings a woman into the house with looks exactly like Annika.

Shivaay refuses to believe their claims as he knows that he had killed her and tests her in many ways which surprisingly she passes.

Later that day Veer and Shivaay return to the place where they had buried Annika and find the real Annika in the coffin. Knowing the truth, Veer leaves, ShiOmRu digs Annika out and in a series of flashbacks, it is revealed that Annika's murder and fake Anika was a part of the plan devised by Shivika.

Annika, disguised as Kumari Rosie Rani, tricks Veer into Shiomru's plan. At holi while everyone was drunk, Veer reveals that he's the son of Roop therefore he is Shivaay, Omkara and Rudra's cousin. Annika tricks Veer along with ShiOmRu so that he makes her his partner. Later Shivaay decides to investigate the Kalyani Mills incident again. He finds out the foreman who is Harsh Vardhan Trivedi. Roop reveals to Veer that she is responsible for the Kalyani Mills fire and the murders of Mr. Kapoor and Harsh. She hatches an evil plan. Shivaay also finds out that Annika is the daughter of Harsh. Annika discovers Gauri is her long-lost sister Chukti.

Redux story
The story takes a different leap, where an author and public speaker, returns all of them to where the story started and changes their lives by changing the circumstances.

Now, Shivaay is a stoic, no-nonsense businessman who is hurt by his parents' death. Pinky's suicide and Shakti's discovery of his affair haunt him. Omkara is also shown as a businessman. Rudra is shown as a supermodel who uses his fame and money as an excuse for everything he does. Priyanka is shown as Shivaay's younger sister this time.

Annika and Gauri live with their aunt who hates them because their mother left their father for another man. Gauri knows nothing of the incident and Annika struggles to make ends meet. She is constantly stressed about paying for Gauri's college tuition, Sahil's medications and house rent, with no help from her aunt.

Although Shivaay and Annika meet, they have a rocky relationship due to Shivaay's distrust of women, Gauri and Omkara meet, and instantly hit it off, Bhavya and Rudra also meet, but his misuse of money and fame irks Bhavya. Shivaay and Annika become closer when the latter is hired by Shivaay's sister Priyanka as a wedding planner. Shivaay is engaged to Tia on the insistence of his grandmother and Priyanka is engaged to Tia's brother Daksh. Both Tia and Daksh are bankrupt and are marrying the Oberoi siblings only for money. Daksh misbehaves with Annika who tries to expose his true nature but fails as Shivaay refuses to believe her.

On Daksh and Priyanka's wedding day, Daksh runs away after being blackmailed by Annika, Priyanka searches for him, meets with an accident and goes into coma. Shivaay holds Annika responsible and marries her forcibly. Eventually, Shivaay realizes Daksh's truth and Priyanka recovers. Shivaay publicly exposes Daksh and asks forgiveness from Annika. Shivaay restores Annika's reputation in society and decides to divorce her. After a long struggle Annika makes Shivaay realise that they are made for each other. Tej returns to India to take over the Oberoi empire, is jealous of Shivaay's fame, and hires Shivaay's friend Mohit to destroy his fame. Mohit comes to Oberoi Mansion along with Nancy, who is one day found murdered in Shivaay's room and he is blamed for it. Later, Shivaay discovers that Nancy was alive and she was not the real Nancy, but she was Mohit's assistant, the dead woman was the real Nancy. Mohit killed his own wife for the sake of her property, Mohit is arrested by Bhavya. Shivaay discovers Tej's intentions. Tej tries to kill his own children, forcing Shivaay to intervene. Shivaay kills Tej and is sent to prison for seven years.

Five years later
In Shivaay's absence, Om and Rudra take over his business and have grown to hate him for killing Tej. The brothers' evil aunt, Roop, reappears to kill Shivaay. Rudra discovers the real reason Shivaay killed Tej and the brothers are reunited. Later, Shivaay remarries Annika. Priyanka marries Shivaay's business rival Jai Kothari.

When Sahil is arrested for drunk driving, Shivaay refuses to bail him out before letting him spend a night in jail, as a result, Sahil vows to retaliate against Shivaay. Jai tries to kill Annika as revenge on Shivaay, but Shivaay saves Annika from her kidnappers. But Shivika's happiness ends soon as they are murdered by an unknown assailant.

20 years later
Annika and Shivaay's son, Shivaansh is a superstar and lives with his great-grandmothers, Kalyani and Aruna. He has a sister, Shivani. Rudra and Bhavya have a son, Dhruv, and Om and Gauri have a daughter, Radhika. She is married to Varun and harbours a secret enmity against the Oberois. Shivaansh has only one dream - to build a hospital in his parents' memory to provide free treatment for poor children. He is shown to be fighting a terminal disease and has a short time left to live.

Aditi Deshmukh, the ACP, is introduced as a self-made, strong Marathi girl who supports her uncle, aunt, and a younger sister. While her sister, Mahu, is a big fan of Shivaansh, Aditi has a strong prejudice against his fame. Aditi's father is revealed to have gone missing when she was a child, making her determined to find him. She is later revealed to be aiding Varun in planning against the Oberois.

Mannat Kaur Khurana is an orphan. Poor, unemployed and treated as a burden by her relatives, she is honest and principled. She gets a job at the Oberoi mansion. Meanwhile, Varun realises that Shivaansh may live if a heart transplant is successful so he abducts Mannat's friend, Munni, and blackmails Mannat. Shivaansh decides to pretend to marry Sonya, an actress, to make his ailing great-grandmother happy. Plotting against Shivaansh, Varun swaps Sonya with Mannat and has them married. Varun then blackmails Mannat to destroy the heart-rate tracker crucial for Shivaansh's treatment so Mannat can inherit Shivaansh's wealth after his death but he fails. Eventually, the story ends with Sahil being exposed as Shivaay and Annika's killer, and Shivaansh and Mannat confessing their love for each other.

Cast

Main
Nakuul Mehta as 
 Shivaay Singh Oberoi: Pinky and Shakti's son; Anika's husband; Shivaansh and Shivani's father
 Shivansh Singh Oberoi: Anika and Shivaay's son; Shivani's brother; Mannat's husband
Surbhi Chandna as Anika Trivedi: Harsh's daughter; Gauri's sister; Shivaay's wife; Shivansh and Shivani's mother
 Kunal Jaisingh as Omkara Singh Oberoi: Jhanvi and Tej's son; Rudra and Priyanka's brother; Gauri's husband; Radhika's father
Shrenu Parikh as Gauri Trivedi: Harsh's daughter; Anika's sister; Omkara's wife; Radhika's mother
Leenesh Mattoo as Rudra Singh Oberoi: Jhanvi and Tej's son; Omkara and Priyanka's brother; Bhavya's husband; Dhruv's father
Mansi Srivastava as ACP Bhavya Rathore: Rudra's wife; Dhruv's mother
Niti Taylor as Mannat Khurana: Oberoi's former employee; Shivansh's wife

Recurring
Reyhna Malhotra as Svetlana Kapoor – Shobhana's daughter; Tia and Saumya's sister; Abhay's wife; Tej and Omkara's ex-fiancée (2016–2018)
Navina Bole as Tia Kapoor – Shobhana's daughter; Svetlana and Saumya's sister; Dushyant's wife; Shivaay's ex-fiancée (2016–2018)
Nehalaxmi Iyer as Saumya Kapoor – Shobhana's daughter; Svetlana and Tia's sister (2016–2018)
Navnindra Behl as Kalyani Singh Oberoi – Matriarch of Oberois'; Tej and Shakti's mother; Shivaay, Omkara, Rudra and Priyanka's grandmother; Shivansh, Shivani, Dhruv and Radhika's great-grandmother
Mahesh Thakur as Tej Singh Oberoi – Kalyani's elder son; Shakti's brother; Jhanvi's husband; Omkara, Rudra and Priyanka's father; Dhruv and Radhika's grandfather (dead)
Mrinal Deshraj as Jahnvi Malhotra Singh Oberoi – Tej's wife; Omkara, Rudra and Priyanka's mother; Dhruv and Radhika's grandmother
Siraj Mustafa Khan as Shakti Singh Oberoi – Kalyani's younger son; Tej's brother; Pinky's husband; Shivaay's father; Shivansh and Shivani's grandfather
Nitika Anand as Pinky Sehgal Singh Oberoi – Shakti's wife; Shivaay's mother; Shivansh and Shivani's grandmother
Sushmita Mukherjee as Dolly Singh Oberoi
Vishavpreet Kaur/Shraddha Kaul as Roop Singh Oberoi – Shivaay, Omkara, Rudra and Priyanka's aunt
Subha Rajput as Priyanka Singh Oberoi Kothari – Tej and Jhanvi's daughter; Omkara and Rudra's sister; Shivaay's cousin; Jai's wife
Pal John as Shivani Singh Oberoi – Shivaay and Anika's daughter; Shivansh's sister; Radhika and Dhruv's cousin (2018–2019)
Sharain Khanduja as Radhika Singh Oberoi – Gauri and Omkara's daughter; Shivansh, Shivani and Dhruv's cousin (2018–2019)
Abhishek Singh Pathania as Dhruv Singh Oberoi – Bhavya and Rudra's son; Shivansh, Shivani and Radhika's cousin (2018–2019)
Manjiri Pupala as Aditi Deshmukh – A corrupt ACP; Mahu's sister; Ashish's accomplice; Shivansh's enemy (2018–2019)
Nikitin Dheer as Veer Singh Oberoi
Avinash Mishra as Abhay Singh Oberoi; Vishal's son; Svetlana's husband (2017)

Nitanshi Goel as Child Anika Trivedi

Anisha Hinduja as Shobana Kapoor
Vividha Kirti as Komal Singh Oberoi: Veer's wife (2017–2018)
Rishika Mihani as Monali Pratap Chauhan: Veer's fake wife (2017–2018)
Unknown as Sweta: Veer and Monali's fake child (2018)
Unknown as Ratan: Dolly's son
Unknown as Vishal Singh Oberoi: Abhay's father; Kalyani's nephew-in-law (2017)
Aryan Prajapati as Young Sahil Chaturvedi: Annika's adoptive brother (2016–2018)
Naman Mukul as Mr. Khanna: Oberoi family's bodyguard (2016–2018)
Ayush Anand as Ranveer Singh Randhawa: Police officer and former ACP, Kamini's adoptive son, Mahi's adoptive brother, Priyanka's husband (2016–2017)
Vrushika Mehta as Ishana: a con-artist (2016)
Krissann Barretto as Romi: Dushyant's sister, Tia's sister-in-law, Saumya's childhood best friend, Rudra's ex-girlfriend (2016-2017)
Additi Gupta as Ragini Malhotra (2017)
Anisha Hinduja as Shobana Kapoor: Mr. Kapoor's wife, Svetlana, Tia and Saumya's mother (2016-2017)
Saurabh Kushwaha as Dushyant/Robin: Tia's husband (2016-2017)
Karan Khanna as Daksh Khurana: Kamini's brother, Mahi's uncle, Ranveer's adoptive uncle, Shivaay's childhood friend, Annika's former fiancé (2016-2017)
Sheeba Chaddha as Maadhuri: a police inspector (2016)
Amrapali Gupta as Kamini Khurana: Shakti's ex-girlfriend, Mahi's mother, Ranveer's adoptive mother (2017)
Rahul Dev as Kaali Thakur: a landowner and don of Bareilly, Gauri's ex-fiancé (2017)
Anjali Mukhi as Nayantara: a bar dancer, Annika's fake mother (2017)
Ankit Raaj as Samarjeet Malhotra: Ragini's brother (2017)
Danish Pandor as Vikram Thapar: Annika's ex-fiancé (2017)
Nitin Bhatia as Nandi "Muthu Swami Iyer" (2017)
Pratibha Tiwari as Tanya Singh Oberoi: Abhay's wife (2017)
Surbhi Jyoti as Mallika Choudhary: Shivaay's former girlfriend, Siddharth's fiancée (2016)
Neelam Panchal as Vandana Chaturvedi: Sahil's mother, Annika's adoptive mother (2018)
Shaleen Malhotra as Siddharth Vikram Rana: Vikram and Ketaki's son, Mallika's fiancé, Shivaay's business rival (2016)
Naved Aslam as Vikram Rana: Ketaki's husband, Siddharth's father (2016)
Manasi Salvi as Ketaki Rana: Vikram's wife, Siddharth's mother (2016)
Aashish Kaul as Mr. Chhabra: Mrs. Chabra's husband, Dev and Reyaan's father (2016)
Anandi Tripathi as Mrs. Chhabra: Mr. Chabra's wife, Reyaan's mother, Dev's step-mother (2016)
Hiten Meghrajani as Reyaan Chhabra: Mr. Chabra and Mrs. Chabra's son, Dev's half-brother, Saumya's ex-boyfriend (2016)
Ish Thakkar as Dev Chhabra: Mr. Chabra's son, Mrs. Chabra's step-son, Reyaan's half-brother, Priyanka's ex-fiancé (2016)
TBA as Zakir: Shivaay's close friend (2017)
Zain Imam as Mohit Malhotra, Nancy's husband, Shivaay's ex-friend (2018)
Mandana Karimi as Nancy Malhotra - Mohit's wife (2018)
Prakhar Toshniwal as Viraj (2018)
Kiran Janjani as Abhimanyu Raheja (2018)
Srishty Rode as Fiza Khan (2018)
Ankit Siwach as Farhan Khan (2018)
Veena Mehta as Kalyani's older sister (2018–2019)
Abhishek Tewari as Nikhil - Anika's ex-fiancée (2018)
Saransh Verma as Avi - Shivaansh's manager and friend (2018–2019)
Supriya Pilgaonkar as Nandini Dixit - the police commissioner, Shivaansh's mother-figure (2018)
Anup Ingale as Khanna Jr. - Khanna's son, Shivaansh's bodyguard and friend (2018–2019)
Manisha Singh Chauhan as Asiya - Shivaansh's publicist and friend (2018–2019)
Amar Upadhyay as Sahil Trivedi - Annika and Gauri's younger brother (2019)

Guests
Arjun Bijlani as Raghav, special appearance
Drashti Dhami as Naina, special appearance
Barun Sobti as Advay Singh Raizada - Shivaay's close friend, a special appearance to promote his show Iss Pyaar Ko Kya Naam Doon 3 (2017)
Kriti Sanon, Ayushmann Khurrana and Rajkummar Rao to promote their film Bareilly Ki Barfi (2017)
Badshah as himself, a special appearance for Shivaay-Anika's Haldi ceremony (2017)
Aakriti Sharma as Kullfi, a special appearance to promote her show Kullfi Kumarr Bajewala (2018)
Supriya Pathak as Hansa Parekh, to promote her new show Khichdi Returns (2018)

Production
On 18 June 2018, a reboot version, Ishqbaaaz: Redux, was launched with a new love story of the leads from the beginning.

Cancellation
Owing to its declining viewership ratings, it took a leap in December 2018 which starred Nakuul Mehta and Manjiri Pupala. As it failed to increase the ratings, Pupala's character was turned negative, resulting in her resignation. Eventually, Niti Taylor was hired to play Mannat Kaur Khurana. The expected ratings were not delivered and it went off air on 15 March 2019.

Spin-off

Dil Boley Oberoi, premiered on 13 February 2017. The show focused on the lives of Omkara and Rudra. It is the first Indian soap to have a spin-off. On 7 July 2017, Dil Boley Oberoi ended and the storyline was merged into Ishqbaaaz. In Dil Boley Oberoi, Shrenu Parikh was introduced as Kunal Jaisingh's character's love interest.

Series detail

Soundtrack

The Ishqbaaaz soundtrack was written by Shaheen Iqbal and composed by Sanjeev Srivastava. Sanjeev Srivastava had composed the original songs and background score for the show. The original version of the album was released on 7 August 2016. "O Jaana", the theme song of the serial was performed by Pamela Jain and Bhaven Dhanak.

"O Saathiya", the theme song of Dil Boley Oberoi, the album released on 1 May 2017. Firstly, the song was made for Omkara and Ishana, but after Ishana left, the song was not used at Ishqbaaaz. When Dil Boley Oberoi aired on, the female version by Pamela Jain was released, but now it also used on this show for Omkara and Gauri, after merging with Ishqbaaaz.

Adaptations

Awards

Asian Viewers Television Awards

Gold Awards

Kalakar Awards

Indian Television Academy Awards

Indian Telly Awards

References

External links
Ishqbaaaz Streaming on Hotstar

2016 Indian television series debuts
2019 Indian television series endings
Hindi-language television shows
Indian drama television series
Television shows set in Mumbai
StarPlus original programming
Television series by 4 Lions Films